The IMI International Top 20 Singles is a weekly record chart in India for international singles, published by the Indian Music Industry (IMI) and supported by the International Federation of the Phonographic Industry (IFPI). Launched on 21 June 2021, it is the first official music industry recognised record chart in India. The chart is reviewed by the IMI Charts committee, comprising representatives from Universal Music Group, Sony Music Entertainment, Times Music, and Warner Music Group. The chart is formulated by BMAT Music Innovators using streaming data from Amazon Music, Apple Music, and Spotify.

The weekly tracking period is from Friday to Thursday, with the chart published the following Monday. "Butter" by BTS was the first number-one song on the chart's inaugural issue dated 21 June 2021. The current number-one on the chart is "Calm Down" by Rema and Selena Gomez, as of the issue dated 13th March 2023.

Number-one singles

References

External links 
 

Top lists
2021 establishments in India
Record charts